Dugu (獨孤) is an extremely rare Chinese compound surname of Xianbei origin. There is also a small Korean population (Namwon Dokgo clan) with this surname (stylized as Dokgo or Tokko (독고) in Korean); many of them are found in North Korea, mainly in Ryongchon County and Uiju County near the Chinese border.

During the 6th century the Dugus were a powerful aristocratic family based in northwest China. They are best remembered today by the Dugu sisters, whose marriages linked the imperial families of 3 successive dynasties — the Northern Zhou (557–581), Sui (581–618), and Tang (618–907).

Shimunek (2017) reconstructs Tabgach *dʊqʊ which underlaid Chinese transcription , which was glossed as  "battle-axe".

Notable people
Dugu Xin (503–557), Western Wei general and official
Dugu sisters (6th century), Dugu Xin's daughters
Empress Dugu (Northern Zhou) (died 558), Emperor Ming of Northern Zhou (Yuwen Yu)'s empress
Dugu Qieluo (544–602), Emperor Wen of Sui (Yang Jian)'s empress
Consort Dugu (died 775), Emperor Daizong of Tang (Li Chu)'s concubine
Dugu Sun (died 905), Tang dynasty minister
 Dugu Qiubai, a fictional master swordsman that has been mentioned in several of Jin Yong's works.

References

Chinese-language surnames
Korean-language surnames of Chinese origin
Xianbei
Individual Chinese surnames